The Divine Temple Church of God is a church complex located in downtown Green Bay, Wisconsin. It was added to the National Register of Historic Places in 2012.

History
Originally known as the Christ Episcopal Church Complex, the complex was constructed in the Gothic Revival style. The complex consists of the church, built 1899–1900; the rectory, built 1911; the school, built 1956–1957; and the 1990 parish hall.

References

External links

Divine Temple Church of God website

Buildings and structures in Green Bay, Wisconsin
Churches in Brown County, Wisconsin
National Register of Historic Places in Brown County, Wisconsin
1900 establishments in Wisconsin